Post Oak Bend City is a town in Kaufman County, Texas, United States. The population was 683 in 2020.

Geography

Post Oak Bend City is located in central Kaufman County at  (32.632202, –96.313518).

Demographics

As of the 2020 United States census, there were 683 people, 174 households, and 138 families residing in the town.

Education 
Post Oak Bend City is served by Kaufman Independent School District. The Kaufman ISD schools are in the city of Kaufman.

References

External links
 Official website

Dallas–Fort Worth metroplex
Towns in Kaufman County, Texas
Towns in Texas